Tillandsia ventanaensis is an epiphytic species in the genus Tillandsia first described in 1995. This species is endemic only to the state of Durango, Mexico between elevations of 1,800-2,000 meters, in the vicinity of the border of Sinaloa in the Sierra de las Ventanas. This plant is stemless, flowering erect 35–55 cm high, with rigid leaves up to 55 cm long.

References

A New Tillandsia from Western Mexico, Renate Ehiersi and Pamela Koide retrieved 1 January 2019

ventanaensis
Endemic flora of Mexico